Placer may refer to one of the following:

Placer deposit
Placer sheep
Placer mining
Placer (geography), a submerged bank or reef.
Placer, rugby league football role.
Placer, a job title in the Pottery industry.

Geographical names:
 Placer, Masbate, Philippines
 Placer, Surigao del Norte, Philippines
 Placer, former name of Loomis, California
 Placer County, California, United States